Rebecca Peterson was the defending champion, but lost to Danielle Collins in the semifinal.

Kayla Day won the title, defeating Collins in an all-American final, 6–1, 6–3.

Seeds

Main draw

Finals

Top half

Bottom half

References 
 Main draw

Tennis Classic of Macon - Singles